Connecticut's 16th Senate district elects one state senator to the Connecticut State Senate.

Geography 
The district includes the East End of Wolcott, Prospect, Southington, and the East End of Waterbury.

List of Senators

References 

16
New Haven County, Connecticut
Hartford County, Connecticut